Horace Field Parshall (9 September 1865–12 December 1932) was an electrical engineer specialising in rotating electrical machines, railway traction, and electrical distribution. Born in America, he worked for General Electric, later moving to the United Kingdom, where he was involved in the installation of a number of electrical schemes, including the Central London Railway and The Lancashire Electric Power Company, becoming a director of both.

In Britain, he was financially successful and used his wealth to construct a mansion, Penbury Grove, near Beaconsfield, Buckinghamshire. After the death of his first wife, he became involved in a bigamy case due to an attempt by a married couple to obtain his wealth through a fraudulent marriage.

He authored a number of works on electrical engineering, and a book on the genealogy of his branch of the Parshall family including a short autobiography.

Biography
Horace Field Parshall was born on 9 September 1865, at Milford, New York, the son of James Everett Parshall (1839–99), a lawyer, and Phoebe Anne née Field (d. 1899). He was educated at Hartwick Seminary, then studied electrical engineering at Cornell University, leaving after two years to study at Lehigh University. He joined the Sprague Electric Railway & Motor Company, and by 25 was a chief design engineer of the Edison General Electric Company, remaining with the company after it amalgamated into the General Electric company.

In 1893, he married Annie Matilda (Blanch) Rogers.

Lectures given at Massachusetts Institute of Technology formed the basis of the books Armature windings of electric machines, and Electric generators (later expanded as  Electric machine design) published between 1895 and 1906.

He was involved in installing electrical equipment on the Dublin tramways, Glasgow tramways, Bristol tramways and elsewhere, and installed the electrical system of the Central London Railway; a pioneering example of a three phase transmission system using rotary converters. He was also chairman of the Central London Railway, and also involved in the design of the system used by The Lancashire Electric Power Company, of which he was also chairman.

In 1912, he became involved in a widely publicised bigamy case - having been tricked into marrying a Mrs. Deborah Jeffreys in 1911, who had been forced under threat of death by her husband to pose as a widow and seduce and marry the widowed Parshall in an attempt to gain access to his wealth. His marriage to Mrs. Jeffreys was annulled, and after a trial Mrs. Jeffreys was given a nominal single day in prison due to having been led into the situation by her estranged husband, and having confessed her situation to Mr. Parshall.

In 1902, he constructed a mansion, Penbury Grove, near Beaconsfield, Buckinghamshire; a replica of Pennsbury Manor, the residence of William Penn of Pennsylvania.

In 1915, he published a genealogy of his branch of the Parshall family, having earlier sponsored the production of a broader genealogical history by J.C. Parshall.

He died on 12 December 1932. He had two children: Horace Field (1903-1986) and Kathleen; both born in England.

Works

Books

Journals

Notes and references

Notes

References

Sources

External links

1865 births
1932 deaths
American electrical engineers
Lehigh University alumni
People from Milford, New York
People associated with transport in London
Engineers from New York (state)